Sammy Korir (born December 12, 1971) is a long distance runner from Kenya.

Biography
Korir was born in Kiboswa village, Nandi county of Rift Valley province, Kenya. In 2003 he finished second in Berlin Marathon with a time of 2:04:56, just one second after the winner of the race, Paul Tergat who broke the previous world record. In 2008 he became the first man to run ten marathons faster than the time of 2:09 hours, by finishing third in Dubai Marathon with a time of 2:08:01. The race was won by Haile Gebrselassie, who narrowly failed to break the world record held by himself.

Overall, Korir has run 20 marathons under 2:12:00 in his career.

Marathon achievements

References

External links

Profile MarathonMajors
Rosa & Associati profile

1971 births
Living people
Kenyan male long-distance runners
Kenyan male marathon runners
Place of birth missing (living people)